The 2012 Kansas Jayhawks football team represented the University of Kansas in the 2012 NCAA Division I FBS football season. The Jayhawks were led by new head coach Charlie Weis and played their home games at Memorial Stadium. They were a member of the Big 12 Conference. They finished the season with 1–11 overall, 0–9 in Big 12, finishing in last place and failing to be bowl eligible (alone in Big 12 teams in doing so).

Pre-season

Coaching change
The Jayhawks fired head coach Turner Gill after going 2–10 in his second year in 2011. He was replaced by former Notre Dame head coach  Charlie Weis.

Recruiting
Following the hire of Charlie Weis, the Jayhawks received a pair of high-profile quarterback transfers in the duo of Dayne Crist from Notre Dame and Jake Heaps from BYU. Crist will be eligible for the 2012 season while Heaps will be eligible for the 2013-2014 seasons.

Roster

Schedule

References

Kansas
Kansas Jayhawks football seasons
Kansas Jayhawks football